Levone is a comune (municipality) in the Metropolitan City of Turin in the Italian region Piedmont, located about  northwest of Turin.

The first recorded document mentioning Levone dates back to 1197.

Levone borders the following municipalities: Forno Canavese, Rivara, Rocca Canavese, and Barbania.

References

Cities and towns in Piedmont
Canavese